Park Ji-Ah (born February 25, 1972), is a South Korean actress. She is a recurring actress in Kim Ki-duk's films, having appeared in five of his works from 2002 to 2008. Her performance in Breath was described as "terrific" by Variety and "a joy to watch" by Twitch Film.

Filmography

Film

Television series

References

External links

Park Ji-a at the Korean Movie Database
Park Ji-a at Hancinema

1972 births
South Korean film actresses
South Korean television actresses
Living people
20th-century South Korean actresses
21st-century South Korean actresses